Amália Traïda is a 2004 Italian black-and-white short film directed by Francesco Vezzoli and starring Lauren Bacall and Sônia Braga.

Plot
The movie is a biopic about Portuguese fadista (fado singer) and actress Amália Rodrigues.

Cast
Lauren Bacall as TV Announcer
Sônia Braga as Amália Rodrigues

References

External links

2004 films
2004 short films
Italian short films
Italian black-and-white films
2000s English-language films